Si Lom station is an underground station of the Bangkok MRT, on the Blue Line. The station is located beneath Rama IV Road at Sala Daeng Intersection, where Si Lom Road begins, serving one of the city's main business districts.

Station
Si Lom station is the 26th station on the Blue Line, lying between the Lumphini and Sam Yan stations on a section of the line running beneath Rama IV Road. It has been described as the most challenging to construct of the Blue Line, since it lies beneath the Thai–Japan Bridge that crosses Sala Daeng Intersection, requiring a complex underpinning process to replace the bridge's original foundations. The station features two vertically stacked platforms beneath the main concourse level, which is deeper than that of other stations to accommodate the bridge foundations. At a depth reaching , it is the deepest station in the MRT system, and features the longest escalator in Southeast Asia.

Si Lom station is connected to Sala Daeng BTS station by a covered elevated walkway, and forms one of the three original main links between the MRT and BTS systems. The station has two exits: one on the northeast corner of the intersection, near the entrance to Lumphini Park, and the other, which connects to the skywalk, on the south corner in front of the Dusit Thani Hotel (now under redevelopment).

Nearby Landmarks 

 Lumphini Park
 Queen Saovabha Memorial Institute
 Patpong Museum
 Silom Complex

References

MRT (Bangkok) stations
Railway stations opened in 2005
2005 establishments in Thailand